This is a list of cities in Estonia that underwent a name change in the past.

Kuressaare → Kingissepa (1952) → Kuressaare (1988)
Reval/Revel → Tallinna (1918) → Tallinn (early 1920s)
Dorpat/Derpt → Jurjev (1893) → Tartu (1918)
Pernau → Pärnu (1918)
Gewi/Jewe → Jõhvi (1918)
Walk → Valga (1918)

See also
List of renamed cities in Latvia
List of renamed cities in Lithuania

 Renamed
Estonia geography-related lists
Estonia, renamed
Renamed, Estonia
Estonia
Names of places in Estonia
Geographic history of Estonia